{{Infobox opera 
| name              = Dom Sébastien, Roi de Portugal
| type              = Grand opera
| composer          = Gaetano Donizetti
| image             = Dom Sebastien 1843 Act3 L'Illustration NGO1p1196.jpg
| image_upright     = 1.4
| caption           = Act 3 in the original production, as the Grand Inquisitor orders the arrest of Dom Sébastien (engraving from L'Illustration)
| librettist        = Eugène Scribe
| language          = French
| based_on          = Paul Foucher's Don Sébastien de Portugal| premiere_date     = 
| premiere_location = Théâtre de la Porte-Saint-Martin, Paris
}}Dom Sébastien, Roi de Portugal (Don Sebastian, King of Portugal) is a French grand opera in five acts by Gaetano Donizetti. The libretto was written by Eugène Scribe, based on Paul Foucher's play Don Sébastien de Portugal which premiered at the Théâtre de la Porte-Saint-Martin on 9 November 1838 It is a historic-fiction about King Sebastian of Portugal (1554–1578) and his ill-fated 1578 expedition to Morocco. The opera premiered on 13 November 1843 at the Salle Le Peletier of the Paris Opéra. This was the last opera that Donizetti completed before going insane as a result of syphilis.

At the time, Donizetti was attempting to compose an opera competitive with similar historical operas by Daniel Auber, Fromental Halévy and Giacomo Meyerbeer. One critical description of the nature of Dom Sébastien is "a funeral in five acts". By contrast, Winton Dean has described the main characteristic of the opera as "uncompromising dramatic honesty" in his comments on unusual dramatic facets of the work. Mary Ann Smart has prepared a critical edition of the opera in French, which includes appendices with variants and additions that Donizetti made for a production in German at the Vienna Hofoper in 1845.

 Roles 

Synopsis
Time: 16th century
Place: Lisbon and Morocco

Act 1LisbonThe Christian king, Dom Sébastian, leaves his uncle Dom Antonio to rule Portugal while he goes on a crusade against the Moors of Africa. Sébastian's entourage includes the idealistic poet Camoëns and the Moor princess Zayda, whom he had rescued from being burnt at stake for trying to escape the monastery she had resided in since her conversion to Christianity (O mon Dieu, sur la terre). He intends to return her to her father Ben-Selim.

Act 2Fez, MoroccoThe reunion between Zayda and Ben-Selim is dampened by her refusal to marry the Moorish chief Abayaldos.A battlefield in MoroccoAbayaldos has led the Moors to battle against Sébastian's forces and mostly wiped them out. The wounded Sébastian's life is saved only when his lieutenant Dom Henrique presents himself to Abayaldos as Sébastian, before expiring from his own wounds, and Zayda pleads for "the Christian's" life (the real Sébastian) in return for her consent to marry Abayaldos, reasoning that her life was saved by a Christian during her captivity in Portugal and that the favor must be returned. Sébastian is left on the battlefield a broken man (Seul sur la terre).

Act 3A public square, LisbonCamoëns has survived the battle and returned to Lisbon (O Lisbonne, o ma patrie!) where he learns that Antonio has aligned himself with the Spanish Grand Inquisitor Dom Juan de Sylva and usurped the throne. He runs into Sébastian, just as the funeral procession for the supposedly dead king passes by. Camoëns causes a commotion in his outrage, and Sébastian is recognized by the people when he intervenes. Abayaldos, for his part, recognizes the lowly "Christian" whose life he had spared. Sébastian is jailed as an imposter.

Act 4A court of law, LisbonAt Sébastian's trial, Zayda proves her love for him by testifying to his true identity and how he escaped death. Abayaldos accuses her of infidelity, and now both Sébastian and Zayda are jailed, she for treason.

Act 5The Lisbon CourtEager to legitimize his deal with Spain, Antonio offers to spare Sébastian's life if Zayda can convince Sébastian to sign the official instrument selling Portugal to Spain. After first refusing, Sébastian signs. Free but distraught, Zayda runs out to drown herself.A tower guarding the entrance to Lisbon Harbor (anachronistically the Belém Tower, symbol of Portuguese independence)

Sébastian catches up with Zayda at the top of the tower. They see Camoëns in a boat attempting to rescue them. Sébastian and Zayda climb down a rope to the boat but are discovered halfway down; they plunge to their deaths when the rope is slashed. Camoëns is killed by gunfire and, at curtain, the Spanish fleet emerges on the horizon. Portugal has lost its independence.

Recordings

References
Notes

Sources
Allitt, John Stewart (1991), Donizetti: in the light of Romanticism and the teaching of Johann Simon Mayr, Shaftesbury: Element Books, Ltd (UK); Rockport, MA: Element, Inc.(USA)
Ashbrook, William (1982), Donizetti and His Operas, Cambridge University Press. 
Ashbrook, William (1998), "Donizetti, Gaetano" in Stanley Sadie (Ed.), The New Grove Dictionary of Opera, Vol. One. London: Macmillan Publishers, Inc.  
Ashbrook, William and Sarah Hibberd (2001), in Holden, Amanda (Ed.), The New Penguin Opera Guide, New York: Penguin Putnam. . pp. 224–247.
Black, John (1982), Donizetti's Operas in Naples, 1822—1848. London: The Donizetti Society.
 Donizetti, Gaetano; Smart, Mary Ann, editor. (2005). Dom Sébastien, Rei de Portugal. Opéra in five acts by Eugéne Scribe (reduction for voice and piano based on the critical edition of the orchestral score). Milan: Ricordi. .
Foucher, Paul (1838), View Don Sébastien de Portugal Paris: J. N. Barba; Delloye; Bezou.
Loewenberg, Alfred (1970). Annals of Opera, 1597–1940, 2nd edition. Rowman and Littlefield

Sadie, Stanley, (Ed.); John Tyrrell (Exec. Ed.) (2004), The New Grove Dictionary of Music and Musicians. 2nd edition. London: Macmillan.  (hardcover).   (eBook).
Smart, Mary Ann (Ed.), Gaetano Donizetti (2004), "Dom Sebastien, rei de Portugal: Opera in Five Acts by Eugène Scribe", The Critical Edition of the Operas of Gaetano Donizetti. Chicago: University of Chicago Press.
 Weinstock, Herbert (1963), Donizetti and the World of Opera in Italy, Paris, and Vienna in the First Half of the Nineteenth Century, New York: Pantheon Books. 

External links
 
 Donizetti Society (London) website
 
 
 Parker, Roger, "Donizetti and Paris", lecture on Dom Sébastien'' at Gresham College, 16 April 2007 (available for download as video or audio files)

Grand operas
French-language operas
Operas by Gaetano Donizetti
Libretti by Eugène Scribe
Operas
1843 operas
Opera world premieres at the Paris Opera
Operas set in Portugal
Operas set in Africa
Operas based on plays